Anna Whitlock (13June 185216June 1930) was a Swedish reform pedagogue, journalist, suffragette and feminist. She was co-founder and twice chairperson of the National Association for Women's Suffrage.

Early life 
Anna Whitlock was the daughter of the merchant Gustaf Whitlock and Sophie Forsgrén, and the sister of the feminist and author  (1848–1936). When her father, a moderately well off businessman, was ruined, the family was supported by her mother, who was many years younger than her father, and who educated herself as a photographer and worked as a translator to support the family. It is said that Whitlock was given her interest in women's issues from her mother. After an inheritance, Sophie Whitlock engaged in building, had apartment buildings set up for female professionals, and she also worked as a secretary for the women's organization Fredrika Bremer Association.

Whitlock studied at the Rossander Course. She worked as a teacher at the Adolf Fredriks folkskola in Stockholm in 1869–1870 and as a governess in Finland in 1870–1872 before enlisting as a student at the Högre lärarinneseminariet in Stockholm, from which she graduated in 1875. Between 1876 and 1878, she studied language and pedagogy in Switzerland, Italy, and France. During her study in France, she was the correspondent of Aftonbladet in Paris.

Educational reformer 
In 1878, she founded a school in Stockholm with Ellen Key, known later as the Stockholms nya samskola (New Co-educational School of Stockholm) and later as Whitlockska samskolan (Whitlock Co-educational School), and served as its principal from its foundation to 1918. This was a pioneer institution. The school was made co-educational in 1893, which was very progressive. Normally only primary schools for children were co-educational in Sweden at the time. It soon became one of the first schools over primary educational level to be co-educational in Sweden. She also introduced innovations such as student councils, parent days, free choice of subject, voluntary education in religion, and vacation colonies for school children. Because of the strict religious tolerance of her school, it became popular among non-Lutherans such as Jews. Her school was successful, was granted government support, and the right to issue professional degrees.

Social reformer and suffragist 
Described as a liberal and updated character with modern progressive views, she was also active in politics, the public debate and reform. She was a member of the board in the Föreningen för religionsfrihet (Freedom for Religious Liberty) for several years in the 1880s. She expressed her liberal views regarding religion as a speaker, and published a work on this issue: Skolans ställning till religionsundervisningen i Sverige och andra länder (The Position of the School regarding the teaching of Religion in Sweden and other nations). At that time, the subject of religion in school education normally only consisted of education of the student in their own religion, that of the state, and nothing else. Whitlock opposed this and made the subject voluntary in her school. She was active as a speaker on geography at the Stockholms arbetarinstitut (Stockholm Workers' Institute) from 1882 to 1897. She was also a member of the board of the association, Frisinnade kvinnor (now Svenska Kvinnors Vänsterförbund) in 1914–1923. Whitlock was an early member of the women's association Nya Idun, founded in 1885, and one of its first committee members.

Whitlock is one of the leading pioneers of the women's suffrage movement in Sweden. She was one of the co-founders of the National Association for Women's Suffrage. In 1902, two motions regarding women suffrage reform were presented to the Swedish Parliament. One was from the Minister of Justice Hjalmar Hammarskjöld, who suggested that married men be given two votes, as they could be regarded to vote in place of their wives as well. The other motion was presented by Carl Lindhagen, who suggested women's suffrage. The Hammarskjöld suggestion aroused anger among women's rights activists, who formed a support group for the Lindhagen motion. On 4 June 1902, National Association for Women's Suffrage (Föreningen för Kvinnans Politiska Rösträtt) or FKPR was founded: initially a local Stockholm society, it became a national organization the year after.

She was a member of the board and served as chairperson twice: in 1903–1907 and 1911–1912. She wrote the first public appeal to the women of Sweden to form a suffrage movement in the press, and she organized the rules of the association. She had a very good relation to her vice chairperson, Signe Bergman, and was respected for her ability to, though personally a liberal, maintain the political neutrality of the association. In 1911, when the suffrage movement was forced to make a political stand against the Conservatives, because their party was by then the only one to oppose women suffrage, the conservative Lydia Wahlström stepped down as chairperson: it was because of the respected ability to be neutral that Whitlock was elected for her second term in office as chairperson in 1911.

In 1905, she founded Kvinnornas Andelsförening Svenska Hem, a cooperative association which attempted to ensure better food quality. This association still exists today.

Award 
Whitlock was awarded the Swedish royal medal Illis quorum meruere labores (commonly called Illis Quorum) by King Gustaf V of Sweden in 1918.

Legacy 
The Anna Whitlock Memorial Fund (Anna Whitlocks Minnesfond) was founded after her school was discontinued in 1976, and still grants scholarships to students.

In popular culture 
The main character of the 2013 TV-series Fröken Frimans krig ("Miss Frimans war"), Dagmar Friman (portrayed by Sissela Kyle), was based on Anna Whitlock.

References

Sources 
 Barbro Hedvall (2011). Susanna Eriksson Lundqvist. red. Vår rättmätiga plats. Om kvinnornas kamp för rösträtt. Förlag Bonnier. 
 Svenska Dagbladets Årsbok / Åttonde årgången (händelserna 1930)
  Vem är det : Svensk biografisk handbok / 1925
 Svenskt biografiskt handlexikon
 Rösträtt för Kvinnor / I Årg. 1912
 Anders Johnson: De gjorde skillnad – Liberala kvinnor från Anna Maria Lenngren till Marit Paulsen, 2009

Further reading

External links
Anna Whitlocks Minnesfond website

1852 births
1930 deaths
Swedish women's rights activists
Swedish suffragists
19th-century Swedish businesspeople
Members of Nya Idun
Recipients of the Illis quorum
19th-century Swedish businesswomen
20th-century Swedish businesswomen
20th-century Swedish businesspeople